Yonatan "Johnny" Goldstein (Hebrew: יונתן "ג'וני" גולדשטיין; born January 29, 1991) is an Israeli multi-platinum record producer and songwriter specializing in pop, hip hop, dance and electronic music. 

Goldstein has collaborated with artists including Black Eyed Peas, David Guetta, Madonna, Shakira, Little Mix, Sia, Major Lazer, Coi Leray, Ava Max, Ozuna, Daddy Yankee, Will.i.am, Galantis, John Legend, Faouzia, Jennifer Hudson, Saucy Santana, NLE Choppa, Latto and more.

Additionally, Goldstein has contributed original compositions featured in global commercial campaigns for Mercedes, Samsung, LG, Honda, Citroen, American Express, Heinz and 7 Up. He is signed to Sony Music Publishing & Artist Publishing Group to a worldwide co-publishing deal.

Career
Goldstein, born in Israel to Yosef and Ora Goldstein, was interested in music from a very young age. He began playing drums at age nine and started writing and singing at 11. He was a member of a rock band in high school.

Using the nickname "Little Johnny" (ג'וני הקטן, Johnny haKatan in Hebrew), he recorded a song with the band Hadag Nahash. After sending a six-song demo to David Klemes (keyboard player for Hadag Nahash), they decided to work on one of the demos as the basis for an album by Goldstein. The project, to be called "My Neighborhood (השכונה שלי, haSkhuna Sheli), never materialized. In addition to the album project and his school load, Goldstein worked with an assortment of artists and musicians, including Avishai Cohen (bassist), Dana Adini, Ania Bukstein, Sagol 59 and Corinne Allal. In 2008, he released his debut album, The Johnny Show, through Helicon Records. It featured 14 tracks and a number of collaborators, including Muki, Hadag Nahash, Rami Fortis, Useless ID, Shlomi Shaban, Avishai Cohen (bassist), Adi Ulmansky, Sha'anan Street, Cohen@Mushon and Kutiman

After graduating from Thelma Yellin High School of Arts, Goldstein collaborated with Israeli pop star Ivri Lider to form the vocalist duo TYP, also known as The Young Professionals. Their debut album, 09:00 to 17:00, 17:00 to Whenever, was released in Israel in 2011 and was greeted with critical and commercial success. TYP was named "Best Israeli Act" at the 2011 MTV Europe Music Awards. Soon after, the group signed with Universal Music Group/Polydor for international distribution, and also signed with events promoter Live Nation Entertainment.

In 2015, Goldstein was selected to be the musical director and music producer for the reboot of the globally successful musical Hair. The production received rave reviews and went on to become the most viewed play of the year, with more than 250 showings. Goldstein then went on to serve as lead music producer and guest judge on The X Factor Israel for both the first and second seasons. He was also a judge on the successful teen oriented show, Band Project.

In 2016, as part of TYP, Goldstein released their final collaboration album together, Remixes and Covers, which includes official remixes for Lana Del Rey, Tove Lo, Moby, Imagine Dragons and Zedd.

In 2019, Goldstein began working alongside rapper and record producer will.i.am on the Black Eyed Peas' eighth studio album TRANSLATION, with features including: Shakira, Tyga, Ozuna, Nicky Jam, Becky G, Maluma, French Montana, El Alfa, Piso 21 & J Rey Soul.producing a total of twelve of fifteen tracks which made its debut at #3 on top Billboard's Latin Albums Chart. Goldstein's first global hit record was his co-production on the Black Eyed Peas' lead single MAMACITA featuring Ozuna and J Rey Soul, which samples Madonna's Latin pop song "La Isla Bonita" (1986).

Charts

charts

Single chart usages for Billboardglobal200
Single chart called without song
Single chart usages for Billboardargentinahot100
Single chart called without song
Single chart usages for Austria
Single chart usages for Billboardrhythmic
Single chart called without song

Discography

Production credits

References

Israeli record producers
21st-century Israeli male singers
Israeli electronic musicians
1991 births
Living people
People from Motza Illit